Mikhl Gelbart (August 21, 1889 – December 20, 1962) was an American composer of Yiddish songs. He was born in Ozorkov, near Lodz, Poland. His music reflected a very American Yiddish motif, and was integral to the curricula of the Arbeter Ring (Workmen's Circle) schools and camps.

He died in New York of bone cancer.

References

1889 births
1962 deaths
Jewish American musicians
American male composers
20th-century American composers
Polish emigrants to the United States
Yiddish-language singers of the United States
People from Kalisz Governorate
Deaths from cancer in New York (state)
20th-century American male singers
20th-century American singers
20th-century American male musicians